Cry in the Wild: The Taking of Peggy Ann is a 1991 American television movie directed by Charles Correll. The plot is based on the true story of the abduction of Peggy Ann Bradnick by an ex-convict and ex-mental patient William Diller Hollenbaugh which took place in Shade Gap, Pennsylvania on May 11, 1966. The film was first aired on NBC, on May 6, 1991, and was the most-watched primetime show of the week.

Cast

References

External links

1991 television films
1991 films
Crime films based on actual events
NBC network original films
Films scored by Sylvester Levay
1990s English-language films
Films directed by Charles Correll